Tonbridge may refer to:

Places
 Tonbridge, a town in Kent, England, containing:
 Tonbridge Grammar School, state-funded
 Tonbridge School, independent
 Tonbridge (UK Parliament constituency), former constituency 
 Tonbridge and Malling (UK Parliament constituency), current constituency  
 Tonbridge railway station
 Tonbridge Angels F.C., a football club
 Lowey of Tonbridge, an ancient tract of land in Kent and Surrey, centred on Tonbridge

Ships
 , a cargo ship of the Southern Railway
 HMS Tonbridge, two ships of the Royal Navy

See also
 Tunbridge (disambiguation)